Sunforest may refer to:

Sunforest (band), a psychedelic folk band
Sunforest (album), a Tom Rapp album